Sara Rachel Jaffee is an American developmental psychologist and professor of psychology at the University of Pennsylvania, where she is also director of graduate studies. She previously held a faculty position at the Institute of Psychiatry. She specializes in the field of developmental psychopathology, with a particular focus on antisocial behavior in children.

References

External links
Faculty page
Lab website

Living people
American developmental psychologists
American women psychologists
21st-century American psychologists
University of Pennsylvania faculty
Oberlin College alumni
University of Wisconsin–Madison alumni
Year of birth missing (living people)
American women academics
21st-century American women
Behavior geneticists